Mary Kirby may refer to:

 Mary Kirby (writer) (1817–1893), writer and illustrator of books for children and books on natural science
 Mary Jane Kirby (born 1989), Canadian rugby union player
 Mary Kostka Kirby (1863–1952), New Zealand Catholic nun